The Ericales are a large and diverse order of dicotyledons. Species in this order have considerable commercial importance including for tea, persimmon, blueberry, kiwifruit, Brazil nuts, argan, and azalea. The order includes trees, bushes, lianas, and herbaceous plants. Together with ordinary autophytic plants, the Ericales include chlorophyll-deficient mycoheterotrophic plants (e.g., Sarcodes sanguinea) and carnivorous plants (e.g., genus Sarracenia).

Many species have five petals, often grown together. Fusion of the petals as a trait was traditionally used to place the order in the subclass Sympetalae.

Mycorrhizal associations are quite common among the order representatives, and three kinds of mycorrhiza are found exclusively among Ericales (namely, ericoid, arbutoid and monotropoid mycorrhiza). In addition, some families among the order are notable for their exceptional ability to accumulate aluminum.

Ericales are a cosmopolitan order. Areas of distribution of families vary largely - while some are restricted to tropics, others exist mainly in Arctic or temperate regions. The entire order contains over 8,000 species, of which the Ericaceae account for 2,000-4,000 species (by various estimates).

Economic importance 
The most commercially used plant in the order is tea (Camellia sinensis) from the family Theaceae. The order also includes some edible fruits, including kiwifruit (esp. Actinidia deliciosa), persimmon (genus Diospyros), blueberry, huckleberry, cranberry, Brazil nut, and Mamey sapote. The order also includes shea (Vitellaria paradoxa), which is the major dietary lipid source for millions of sub-Saharan Africans.  Many Ericales species are cultivated for their showy flowers: well-known examples are azalea, rhododendron, camellia, heather, polyanthus, cyclamen, phlox, and busy Lizzie.

Gallery of photos

Classification 
These families are recognized in the APG III system as members of the Ericales:

 Family Actinidiaceae (kiwifruit family)
 Family Balsaminaceae (balsam family)
 Family Clethraceae (clethra family)
 Family Cyrillaceae (cyrilla family)
 Family Diapensiaceae
 Family Ebenaceae (ebony and persimmon family)
 Family Ericaceae (heath, rhododendron, and blueberry family)
 Family Fouquieriaceae (ocotillo family)
 Family Lecythidaceae (Brazil nut family)
 Family Marcgraviaceae
 Family Mitrastemonaceae
 Family Pentaphylacaceae
 Family Polemoniaceae (phlox family)
 Family Primulaceae (primrose and snowbell family) 
 Family Roridulaceae
 Family Sapotaceae (sapodilla family)
 Family Sarraceniaceae (American pitcher plant family)
 Family Sladeniaceae
 Family Styracaceae (silverbell family)
 Family Symplocaceae (sapphireberry family)
 Family Tetrameristaceae
 Family Theaceae (tea and camellia family)

Likely phylogenetic relationships between the families of the Ericales:

Previously included families 
These families are not recognized in the APG III system but have been in common use in the recent past:

 Family Myrsinaceae (cyclamen and scarlet pimpernel family) → Primulaceae
 Family Pellicieraceae → Tetrameristaceae
 Family Maesaceae → Primulaceae
 Family Ternstroemiaceae → Pentaphylacaceae
 Family Theophrastaceae → Primulaceae

These make up an early diverging group of asterids. Under the Cronquist system, the Ericales included a smaller group of plants, which were placed among the Dilleniidae:
 Family Ericaceae
 Family Cyrillaceae
 Family Clethraceae
 Family Grubbiaceae
 Family Empetraceae
 Family Epacridaceae
 Family Pyrolaceae
 Family Monotropaceae

See also
Paradinandra

References

Bibliography 

 
 
 
 
 
 

 
Angiosperm orders